The 1996 WAC Championship Game was a college football game played on Saturday, December 7, 1996, at Sam Boyd Stadium in Whitney, Nevada. This was the 1st WAC Championship Game and determined the 1996 champion of the Western Athletic Conference. The game featured the BYU Cougars, champions of the Mountain division, and the Wyoming Cowboys, champions of the Pacific division. BYU would win the game 28–25 in overtime and secure the program's 19th and last-ever WAC championship.

Teams

BYU

Wyoming

Game summary

Statistics

References

Championship
WAC Championship Game
BYU Cougars football games
Wyoming Cowboys football games
December 1996 sports events in the United States
1996 in sports in Nevada